The 1999–2000 League of Wales was the eighth season of the League of Wales since its establishment in 1992. It began on 20 August 1999 and ended on 6 May 2000. The league was won by Total Network Solutions.

League table

Results

References

Cymru Premier seasons
1
Wales